
Medford may refer to:

Medford (surname)

Places

Canada 
Medford, Nova Scotia

England 
Medford Hall, Staffordshire

United States 
Medford, Indiana
Medford, Maine
Medford, Massachusetts
Medford, Minnesota
Medford, Missouri
Medford, New Jersey
Medford Lakes, New Jersey
Medford, New York
Medford, Oklahoma
Medford, Oregon
Medford, Wisconsin, a city
Medford (town), Wisconsin, Mostly surrounds the city
Medford Township (disambiguation)

Television 
Medford, Texas, the fictional setting of the American television series Young Sheldon